Lumumba Carson (August 4, 1956 – March 17, 2006), known by his stage names Baba Professor X the Overseer, Professor X, or PXO was born the son of Brooklyn-based activist Sonny Carson.

Carson was a founding member of the hip hop group X Clan and was featured in nearly all songs on the albums To the East, Blackwards (1990) and Xodus (1992), before the group went on hiatus. He released two solo albums:Years of the 9, on the Blackhand Side (1990) and Puss 'N Boots (The Struggle Continues...) (1993).

Carson died from complications associated with spinal meningitis in 2006.

He was survived by two daughters, Amanimelele Carson and Hebhyanza Wilkins.

Albums
Years of the 9, on the Blackhand Side (1990)
Puss 'N Boots (The Struggle Continues...) (1993)

See also

Political hip hop
Black nationalism
Afrocentrism

References

External links
 X Clan Music (X Clan official Web site)
 

African-American poets
African-American rappers
English-language poets
Hip hop activists
Island Records artists
Polydor Records artists
Rappers from Brooklyn
1956 births
2006 deaths
20th-century American poets
20th-century African-American writers
21st-century African-American people
Deaths from meningitis